Sagaholm is the site of Bronze Age burial mounds (Sagaholmshögen).

Sagaholmshögen
Sagaholmshögen is a cairn  dating from the early Nordic Bronze Age (c. 1700–500 BC).
The site  had a large barrow with a circle of slabs of sandstone, probably numbering as many as 100. The Bronze Age graves were built in the form of a mound. Around  1,500 years after the grave was built, another four smaller graves were constructed at the foot of the mound.
Only 45 graves remain, with 18 of them adorned with petroglyphs depicting ships, animals and people, including scenes of zoophilia. The finds are presently on display in Jönköpings County Museum (Jönköpings läns museum) in  Jönköping.

See also
The King's Grave
Trundholm sun chariot
Skelhøj

References

Sources
Goldhahn, Joakim (2006) Om döda och efterlevande med exempel från Bredrör, Skelhøj, Sagaholm och Mjeltehaugen (Bergen, Norway: "Arkeologiske Skrifter". Pg 283-303)

External links
Sagaholm
Jönköpings läns museum website 

Nordic Bronze Age
Germanic archaeological sites
Archaeological sites in Sweden
Geats
Zoophilia